Sonja Zekri (born 1967) is a German journalist and author. Her topics are Near East, Eastern Europe, culture and  religion, among others.

Career 

Born in Dortmund, Zekri studied history and Slavic languages at the Ruhr University Bochum. From 2001 she worked for the Feuilleton of the Süddeutsche Zeitung (SZ). She participated in publishing a series in 17 entries Deutschland extrem, which appeared first in the die zunächst in der SZ and then as a book in 2004. From 2008 to 2011 she was the correspondent of the SZ in Moscow. From April 2011 she was the correspondent in Cairo for both the SZ and the Tages-Anzeigers, reporting from the Arabian region.

Selected publications
 Sonja Zekri,  (ed.): Deutschland extrem - Reisen in eine unbekannte Republik. C. H. Beck, Munich 2004, .

References

External links 
 Sonja Zekri: Deutschland extrem (in German) single-generation.de
 Rühle, Alex / Zekri, Sonja (ed): / Deutschland extrem - Reisen in eine unbekannte Republik (in German) review of the book on  buchinformationen.de
 Sonja Zekri: "Wikipedia erfindet sich neu" (in German) Süddeutsche Zeitung, 11 May 2010

German reporters and correspondents
German women journalists
Süddeutsche Zeitung people
German newspaper journalists
1967 births
Living people
Writers from Dortmund